In philately, a mint stamp is one which is in its original state of issue, is unused, has never been mounted and has full gum, if issued with gum. The term applies equally to postage stamps and revenue stamps.

In practice, the term is used within philately to refer to any stamp that appears to be unused, including those without gum, or previously hinged.

Unlike other collectibles, a mint stamp may be in poor condition but still be regarded as being in mint state as long as it is apparently unused.

Variations 
Variations of the term mint include:
Mint hinged (MH) – the stamp is unused but has been previously hinged. Remains of the hinge or gum disturbance are visible.
Mounted mint (MM) – the same as Mint hinged.
Mint no gum (MNG) – the stamp appears to be unused but has no gum. It might have been used but not cancelled, or have been issued without gum.
Unmounted mint (UM) – the stamp is unused and appears never to have been mounted.
Mint never hinged (MNH) – the same as unmounted mint but with an assertion that the stamp is not a formerly mounted stamp that has been tampered with to remove traces of mounting.
The hinging referred to in these terms is mounting of the stamp in a stamp album by the application of a stamp hinge to the back of the stamp. The highest grade is unmounted mint or mint never hinged. The term mint never hinged has developed to provide reassurance to buyers that the stamp has not been tampered with to remove traces of mounting, as the term unmounted mint was thought to be ambiguous.

Value 
Mint stamps are often more valuable than used stamps as in many cases fewer mint stamps survive. A mint stamp may also be in better condition than a used stamp which has passed through the mail. Sometimes, however, used stamps may be more valuable than mint ones where higher numbers of mint stamps have survived, perhaps because large numbers of mint stamps were bought by collectors but few used on letters.

Tampering 
Differences between mint and used values for the same stamp have led to a small industry in removing, or adding, postal cancellations to stamps. Another common practice is to attempt to remove fiscal cancellations, which are often pen cancels, in order to change a stamp used fiscally (for tax purposes) to one apparently unused. Stamps available for both postage and revenue (fiscal) purposes are usually worth more unused or with a postal cancellation. Madame Joseph specialised in the addition of forged cancels to stamps that were worth more used than unused.

See also
 Mint condition
 Pen cancel
 Postage stamp gum
 Regummed stamp
 Stamp condition

References 

Philatelic terminology